Ryde Esplanade railway station serves the town of Ryde on the Isle of Wight, and forms part of the Ryde Transport Interchange. Located on the sea front, it is the most convenient station for the majority of the town.  Ryde Esplanade is also the location of the principal ticket office and all lost property facilities for the Island Line. The larger St John's Road station houses the area office and is next to Ryde Traincare Depot, where all in-house maintenance for the line takes place.

History 
A station has existed on the site since 29 August 1864, when a horse-drawn tram service began operation along the new Ryde Pier.  This service, and the line it ran along, pre-dates both the railway line and the current facilities on the site.  The tramway was extended to St John's Road in August 1871, but in 1880 this service was replaced by the railway line and current station.  The tramway station was originally known as Pier Gate.  Trams continued running under various power sources until after the Grouping of Britain's railways in 1923, right up to January 1969. The tram lines and the remaining terminus platforms for them are still visible at the western end of platform 1.

Stationmasters

John Henry Astridge 1880 - 1884 (also station master of Ryde Pier Head)
James Langworthy 1884 - 1894 (also station master of Ryde Pier Head)
William Percy Froud 1895 - 1905 (afterwards station master at Portsmouth Town and Portsmouth Harbour)
T.J.D. Russell 1905 - 1906
George Henry French 1906 - 1930 (also station master at Ryde Pier Head, from 1913 also station master at Ryde St John's)
Malcolm J. Bucket 1930 - 1931 (formerly station master at Fratton, also station master at Ryde St John's and Ryde Pier Head)
H.E. Millichap ca. 1935 - 1941 (also station master at Ryde St John's and Ryde Pier Head)
T.F. Thompson 1941 - 1949
T. Rowley Cliff ca. 1951

Facilities
There are two tracks through the station, and therefore two platform faces.  The southern platform 1 is used for all regular passenger services, meaning that on departure trains may run in either direction.  Platform 2 has previously been used for additional shuttle trains from the Esplanade to the Pier Head, but has fallen into disuse.  Part of this second platform was due to be demolished in March 2007 under a separate Network Rail project.  Access between the two platforms was by means of a subway.  This subway is no longer open to the public and is regularly flooded to a depth of several metres.  There is a canopy over platform one, while platform two has a simple shelter over the subway entrance.  All passenger facilities, including the ticket office and access to Ryde bus station, are found next to platform one on the south side of the site.

Service pattern
As of May 2022, there are two trains per hour during the peak and one during the off-peak to all destinations south, except Smallbrook Junction which is not always open to passengers. There is generally an hourly service north to Ryde Pier Head, though with two-hour gaps in the mid-morning and mid-afternoon. Two early morning services and one late evening service opereate with Ryde only, the morning 06:08 arrival from Ryde St Johns being the UK's shortest distance rail service.

Prior to upgrade work on the line in 2021,  the location of passing loops on the mainly single-track line meant that services could only run at intervals of 20 or 40 minutes.

aGallery

References

Railway stations on the Isle of Wight
DfT Category E stations
Former Portsmouth and Ryde Joint Railway stations
Railway stations in Great Britain opened in 1880
Island Line railway stations (Isle of Wight)
Railway stations serving harbours and ports in the United Kingdom
Ryde